This is a list of notable documentary filmmakers from India arranged in alphabetical order.

A
 A. K. Chettiar
 Aarti Shrivastava
 Akanksha Damini Joshi
 Amudhan R P
 Anand Patwardhan
 Anwar Jamal
 Aparna Sanyal
 Arun Chadha
 Ashvin Kumar
 Shah Alam (filmmaker)

B
 Biju Toppo

C
 C. S. Venkiteswaran
 Chalam Bennurkar

D
 Debalina Majumder
 Deepika Narayan Bhardwaj
 Dinanath Gopal Tendulkar
 Dinesh D'Souza

E
 Ezra Mir

F
 Faiza Ahmad Khan

G
 Gauhar Raza
 Gopal Menon
 Goutam Ghose
 Sonali Gulati

H
 Harjant Gill

J
 Jagat Murari

K
 K P SASI
 K. Bikram Singh
 K. M. Chaitanya
 Kabir Khan

L
Lalit Vachani
Leena Manimekalai
Lubna Yusuf

M
 M. F. Husain
 Maga.Tamizh Prabhagaran
 Mainak Bhaumik
 Mazhar Kamran
 Mike Pandey
 Mira Nair
 Mrinmoy Bhowmick
 Meghnath

N
 Nakul Singh Sawhney
 Nandan Saxena
 Nisha Pahuja
 Nishtha Jain
 Nirmal Baby Varghese

P
 Pan Nalin
 Pankaj Butalia
 Paromita Vohra
 Prakash Jha
 Parvez Sharma
 Pavel (film director)
Poorva Dinesh

Q
 Qaushiq Mukherjee

R
 Rajesh S. Jala
 Rajesh Touchriver
 Rakesh Sharma (filmmaker)
 Ritu Sarin
 Rituparno Ghosh
 Ritwik Ghatak

S
 Shiny Benjamin
 Saba Dewan
 Sanjay Kak
 Sathish Kalathil
Satyaprakash Upadhyay
 Shashwati Talukdar
 Shriprakash Prakash
 Sonali Gulati
 Sankar
 Sridhar Rangayan
 Stalin K
 Shyam Benegal

V
 Vidhu Vinod Chopra
 Vijaya Mulay
 Vinay Shukla

References

External links
 The Best Film Directors of Indian Cinema
 India, Through the Lens of Documentary Films
 Women documentary filmmakers

documentary
Indian filmmakers